Monochroa suffusella, the notch wing neb, is a moth of the family Gelechiidae. It is found from Fennoscandia to the Pyrenees and Alps and from Ireland to Romania. In the east, the range extends to Japan. The habitat consists of bogs, fens, swamps and salt-marshes.

The wingspan is 10–12 mm. The forewings are pale luteous (yellow), suffused with greyish fuscous. The hindwings are griseous (mottled grey). Adults have been recorded on wing from June to July.

The larvae feed on Eriophorum angustifolium. They mine the leaves of their host plant. Initially, the larva bores into the stem of the host plant and mines the lower part of the leaf. After overwintering the larva creates a short pale reddish gallery in the lowest part of the leaf it overwintered in. Later, this mine is extended upwards in the green part of the leaf. Full-grown larvae leave the mine to pupate. Larvae can be found from autumn to spring. The larvae have a dull yellow body and a dark brown head.

References

Moths described in 1850
Monochroa
Moths of Japan
Moths of Europe